Lien Mermans (born 27 September 1990) is a Belgian football midfielder who last played for VC Moldavo.

Club career
Mermans started her senior career at Vlimmeren, which later became known as Women's Department Lierse SK.

After 1 year with DVC Eva's Tienen, she returned to Lierse where she played from 2010 until 2016. During that period, they won the Belgian Cup twice.
At the end of the 2015/16 season, Lierse's women's department folded because of financial problems and Mermans subsequently joined KRC Genk Ladies.
Her first year at Genk saw some good performances rewarded with "The Sparkle" trophy - the women's equivalent of the Belgian Golden Shoe.

She missed out on most of the 2017/18 season and the UEFA Women's Euro 2017 tournament because of an inflammation on the heart muscle.
At the end of 2018, Mermans announced her retirement from the national team and signed for D1 team VC Moldavo.

International career
Mermans was a long-time member of the Belgian women's national team. At youth level she played for U-15, U-17 and U-19.

On sep. 5, 2009 she earned her first cap for the senior team in a friendly game against Romania where she substituted Femke Maes in the 88th minute. The match ended in a 2-7 win for Belgium.

The first time she scored was on 20 juni 2012, during a qualification match for UEFA Women's Euro 2013 in an away game against Hungary. Mermans started the match and scored 0-1 in the 13th minute.

Mermans' 48th and final cap was in a friendly against Scotland on 11 April 2017, where she scored 2-0 in the 46th minute. The game ended in a 5-0 victory.

Personal life
Mermans works full-time as a physical education teacher.

Career statistics
International

Honours 
Lierse SK
Runners-up
 Belgian Women's Super Cup: 2012–13

Individual
 Winner of The Sparkle trophy: 2017

References

External links 
 
 

1990 births
Living people
Belgian women's footballers
Women's association football forwards
Belgium women's international footballers
Lierse SK (women) players
BeNe League players
Super League Vrouwenvoetbal players
KRC Genk Ladies players